The Chitagá-Pamplona Fault is an inactive sinistral oblique thrust fault in the departments of Norte de Santander and Boyacá in northeastern Colombia. The fault cross-cuts the northern part of the Eastern Ranges of the Colombian Andes and the Catatumbo Basin.

Etymology 
The fault was named after Chitagá and Pamplona, Norte de Santander.

Description 
The Chitagá-Pamplona Fault parallels the Morronegro-Las Mercedes Fault System and places Paleozoic rocks on the west against Tertiary and Cretaceous rocks on the east. The structural behavior of the fault is very similar to faults of the Morronegro-Las Mercedes Fault System. Both faults are believed to be an extension of the Boconó Fault and associated faults of the Venezuelan Andes. The fault starts in northernmost Boyacá in the municipality Chiscas, just north of the Sierra Nevada del Cocuy, where it places the Devonian Floresta Formation in the hanging wall against the Cretaceous Río Negro Formation in the footwall.

Activity 
The fault was probably active in the Pleistocene, at an estimated range of between 1.6 Ma and 750 ka.

See also 

 List of earthquakes in Colombia
 Bucaramanga-Santa Marta Fault
 Eastern Frontal Fault System

References

Bibliography

Maps 
 
 

Seismic faults of Colombia
Thrust faults
Strike-slip faults
Inactive faults
Faults